The 2003 European Road Championships were held in Athens, Greece, between 15 August and 17 August 2003. Regulated by the European Cycling Union. The event consisted of a road race and a time trial for men and women under 23.

Schedule

Individual time trial 
Friday 15 August 2003
 Women U23, 24 km
 Men U23, 32 km

Road race
Sunday 17 August 2003
 Women U23, 105.6
 Men U23, 156.8

Events summary

Medal table

References

External links
The European Cycling Union

European Road Championships, 2003
Road cycling
European Road Championships by year
International cycle races hosted by Greece